KRT72 is a keratin gene. It is responsible for hair formation, and it encodes a protein present in the inner root sheath of hair follicles.

References 

 "KRT72 Gene - GeneCards | K2C72 Protein | K2C72 Antibody". www.genecards.org. Retrieved 2022-05-19